David Franklin Weinstein (born June 17, 1936) is a former Democratic member of the North Carolina General Assembly who represented the state's thirteenth Senate district, including constituents in Hoke and Robeson counties. He was born in Lumberton, North Carolina. A retired merchant from Lumberton, North Carolina, Weinstein served in the Senate from 1997 through 2009, when Gov. Beverly Perdue appointed him to head the Governor's Highway Safety Program. He was replaced in the Senate by Michael P. Walters.

References

External links

|-

1936 births
Living people
Democratic Party North Carolina state senators
21st-century American politicians
Politicians from Charlotte, North Carolina